The list of churches in Hamar is a list of the Church of Norway churches in the Diocese of Hamar which includes all of Innlandet county (plus two municipalities in Viken county) in Norway. The list is divided into several sections, one for each deanery (headed by a provost) in the diocese. Administratively within each deanery, the churches are divided by municipalities each of which has their own church council and then into parishes which have their own councils. Each parish may have one or more local church.

The Diocese of Hamar was first established in 1153 when Norway was part of the Catholic Church. During the Reformation in Norway, in 1537, the diocese was incorporated into the Diocese of Christiania. In 1864, the Diocese of Hamar was re-established and at that time, it included all of Hedmark and Oppland counties. Originally, the diocese was divided into Hedemarken prosti (later Hamar domprosti), Gudbrandsdalen prosti, Valdres prosti, and Hadeland, Ringerike og Hallingdal prosti. Over the years, the various deaneries have been subdivided and changed. Currently, there are 10 deaneries. On 1 January 2020, the two counties were merged into Innlandet county except for the municipalities of Lunner and Jevnaker which were merged into Viken county, so the diocese includes all of Innlandet plus the two municipalities in Viken. As of 2018, the  diocese had 308,697 members (about 82% of the population).

Hamar domprosti 

This arch-deanery covers several municipalities in the central part of the diocese. It includes the municipalities of Hamar, Løten, and Stange. The arch-deanery is headquartered at the Hamar Cathedral in the city of Hamar in Hamar Municipality.

Hadeland og Land prosti 
This deanery covers several municipalities in the southern part of the diocese. It is the only deanery in the diocese to span parts of two counties. It includes the municipalities of Gran, Nordre Land, and Søndre Land in Innlandet county and Jevnaker and Lunner in Viken county. The deanery is headquartered at Ål Church in the village of Jaren in Gran Municipality.

The deanery was established in 1864 when Jevnaker and Lunner from the Hadeland, Ringerike og Hallingdal prosti and Nordre Land and Søndre Land from the Valdres prosti were joined to form the newly created Hadeland og Land prosti.

Nord-Gudbrandsdal prosti 

This deanery covers several municipalities in the northwestern part of the diocese. It includes churches in the municipalities of Dovre, Lesja, Lom, Nord-Fron, Sel, Skjåk, and Vågå. The deanery is headquartered at Sel Church in the north side of the town of Otta in Sel Municipality.

The deanery was established in 1871 when the old Gudbrandsdalen prosti was divided into Søndre Gudbrandsdalen prosti and Nordre Gudbrandsdalen prosti. In 1922, the spelling of the name was changed from Nordre Gudbrandsdalen prosti to Nord-Gudbrandsdalen prosti (both mean "northern Gudbrandsdalen"). Also in 1922, Sel municipality was transferred out of this deanery to the new Midtre Gudbrandsdal prosti ("middle Gudbrandsdal"). In 1972, the Midtre Gudbrandsdal prosti was dissolved and the municipalities of Sel and Fron were transferred into this deanery at that time.

Nord-Østerdal prosti 
This deanery covers several municipalities in the northeastern part of the diocese. It includes the municipalities of Alvdal, Folldal, Os, Rendalen, Tolga, and Tynset. The deanery is headquartered at Tynset Church in the village of Tynset in Tynset Municipality.

The deanery was established in 1868 when the old Østerdalen prosti was divided into Søndre Østerdalen prosti and Nordre Østerdalen prosti. In 1922, the spelling of the name was changed from Nordre Østerdalen to Nord-Østerdalen, both meaning "northern Østerdalen".

Ringsaker prosti 
This deanery covers the municipality of Ringsaker in the central part of the diocese. The deanery is headquartered at Ringsaker Church in the village of Moelv in Ringsaker Municipality.

The deanery was established in 2007 when it was separated from the Hamar domprosti.

Solør, Vinger og Odal prosti 
This deanery covers several municipalities in the Glåmdal river valley in the southeastern part of the diocese. It includes the municipalities of Eidskog, Kongsvinger, Nord-Odal, Sør-Odal, Grue, Våler, and Åsnes. The deanery is headquartered at Vinger Church in the town of Kongsvinger in Kongsvinger Municipality.

The deanery was established in 1855 when the old Øvre Romerike prosti was divided. It was originally called Solør and Odal prosti. In 1868, northern part of Solør (Våler and Åsnes parishes) was transferred to the then newly established Sør-Østerdal prosti. In 1922, the southern part of Solør (Hof, Grue, and Brandval parishes) were separated to join the newly created Solør prosti. The remaining parts of this deanery then changed its name to Vinger og Odal prosti. In 1990, the parish of Brandval was transferred from Solør prosti to Vinger og Odal prosti. In 2013, the deanery regained its original boundaries when the old Solør prosti was merged back. The deanery's name was then changed to Solør, Vinger og Odal prosti.

Sør-Gudbrandsdal prosti 
This deanery covers several municipalities in central part of the diocese. It includes the municipalities of Gausdal, Lillehammer, Ringebu, Sør-Fron, and Øyer. The deanery is headquartered at Lillehammer Church in the town of Lillehammer in Lillehammer Municipality.

The deanery was established in 1871 when the old Gudbrandsdalen prosti was divided into Nordre Gudbrandsdalen prosti and Søndre Gudbrandsdalen prosti. In 1922, the spelling of the name was changed from Søndre Gudbrandsdalen prosti to Sør-Gudbrandsdalen prosti (both mean "southern Gudbrandsdalen"). Also in 1922, Ringebu municipality was transferred out of this deanery to the new Midtre Gudbrandsdal prosti ("middle Gudbrandsdal"). In 1972, the Midtre Gudbrandsdal prosti was dissolved and the municipality of Ringebu was transferred into this deanery.

Sør-Østerdal prosti 
This deanery covers several municipalities in the east-central part of the diocese. It includes the municipalities of Elverum, Engerdal, Stor-Elvdal, Trysil, Åmot. The deanery is headquartered at Elverum Church in the town of Elverum in Elverum Municipality.

The deanery was established in 1868 when the old Østerdalen prosti was divided into Søndre Østerdalen prosti and Nordre Østerdalen prosti. In 1922, the spelling of the name was changed from Søndre Østerdalen to Sør-Østerdalen. Both mean "southern Østerdalen".

Toten prosti 

This deanery covers three municipalities in the southern part of the diocese. It includes the municipalities of Gjøvik, Vestre Toten, and Østre Toten. The deanery is headquartered at Gjøvik Church in the town of Gjøvik in Gjøvik Municipality. The deanery was established in 1853 when the old Toten og Valdres prosti was divided into Valdres prosti and Toten prosti.

Valdres prosti 
This deanery covers several municipalities in Valdres in the southwestern part of the diocese. It includes the municipalities of Etnedal, Nord-Aurdal, Sør-Aurdal, Vang, Vestre Slidre, and Øystre Slidre. The deanery is headquartered at Aurdal Church in the village of Aurdal in Nord-Aurdal Municipality.

Valdres prosti was established in 1853 when the old Toten og Valdres prosti was divided into Valdres prosti and Toten prosti. In 1864, the municipalities of Nordre Land and Søndre Land were transferred from this deanery to the Hadeland og Land prosti.

References

 
Hamar